A marlinspike (sometimes spelled marlin spike, marlinespike, or [archaic] marlingspike) is a tool used in marine ropework.  Shaped in the form of a polished metal cone tapered to a rounded or flattened point, it is used in such tasks as unlaying rope for splicing, untying knots, drawing marline tight using a marlinspike hitch, and as a toggle joining ropes under tension in a belaying pin splice.

They are usually made from iron or steel, whereas fids, similar in shape and function, are formed from wood or bone. The marlinspike may be a separate tool or one item on a pocket knife.

Sailors who become proficient at knot tying, splicing, and sewing using the marlinspike are said to have mastered marlinespike seamanship, earning them the right to be known as marlin spikes or marlinspike seamen.

Uses

Marlinspikes are used:

 As levers to open strands of laid rope when forming eyes or inserting items into the lay.
 To untie knots that have tightened under tension. 
 As a lever or handle to tension marline or rope using a marlinspike hitch, much tighter than by gripping the line with the hand alone.
 As an improvised weapon against hostile boarding parties.

Etymology
Marlinspike derives from the practice of "marling", winding small diameter twine called marline around larger ropes to form protective whippings. The long-billed fish marlin is thought to be named after the marlinspike.

See also
Marlinspike Hall
Fid

References

Ropework
Nautical terminology

fr:Épissoir